Love Never Fails is the debut studio album by English singer Jahméne Douglas. It was released in the United Kingdom through RCA Records on 22 July 2013. The album consists entirely of cover versions. The lead single, "Titanium" (originally by David Guetta and Sia), reached number 94 on the UK Singles Chart. The album sold 18,904 copies in its first week and debuted at number one on the UK Albums Chart.

Background and recording
After finishing as the runner-up of the ninth series of The X Factor on 9 December 2012, there was speculation as to which label Douglas would be signed to. On 19 December, it was announced that he had signed a record deal with Sony Music. On 25 January 2013, it was confirmed that he had signed with RCA Records and would be releasing his debut album in May.

In an interview with Digital Spy, Douglas explained the early meetings with record companies: "The first meeting was about doing a covers album for Mother's Day. I said, 'No thanks, I'd rather walk away now'. There's cheese and then there's cheesy cheese. Hopefully this album is a bit more serious, because of the meaning behind each song.". The album was originally slated for release on 27 May, but was delayed due to Douglas' commitments on the X Factor tour. It ended up being recorded in May in just seven days. Douglas said that "It was originally meant to be released on May 27 – the delay was basically due to me needing to make the album. I think the label forgot that I was on the X Factor tour, so I ended up making it in about week."

On 30 May, Douglas revealed the details of his debut album. He announced that it would be called Love Never Fails and would comprise ten songs – all cover versions. He also revealed that the album would be released in the UK on 22 July 2013 and the lead single would be a cover of David Guetta and Sia's "Titanium". One of the tracks, "The Greatest Love of All", features Douglas's X Factor mentor Nicole Scherzinger. Of the collaboration, Douglas said "Nicole knew this would be one of my favourite songs. And when she sang it with me on the final it was like singing with my big sister. She's so incredibly talented. This song and Nicole ooze class." Douglas also confirmed on 18 June that he had teamed up with Stevie Wonder for his version of Whitney Houston's "Give Us This Day".

Promotion
Members of the London Community Gospel Choir, along with a five-piece band, joined him on stage, where he performed the majority of his album.

Chart performance
On 25 July 2013, Love Never Fails entered the Irish Albums Chart at number 30. On 28 July, it entered the UK Albums Chart at number one, selling 18,904 copies. Its sales were the lowest for a UK number-one album since Rihanna regained the top spot with Talk That Talk 50 weeks earlier. The album was also number one on the Scottish Albums Chart.

Track listing
All music produced by Graham Stack and Matt Furmidge.

Charts and certifications

Weekly charts

Year-end charts

Certifications

Release history

References

2013 debut albums
Jahméne Douglas albums
RCA Records albums